The New York City Board of Correction (BOC) is an agency of the New York City government that regulates conditions of confinement, correctional health, and mental health care in city correctional facilities.

See also
 New York City Department of Correction

References

External links
 
 Board of Correction in the Rules of the City of New York

Correction
New York City Department of Correction